Julliani Eersteling (born 27 October 2001) is a Dutch professional footballer who plays as a defender for Eerste Divisie club Jong FC Utrecht.

Club career
Eersteling played in the youth department of Sparta Rotterdam. In the 2018–19 season, he made five appearances for Jong Sparta in the Tweede Divisie. 

In 2020, he left on a free transfer to Go Ahead Eagles, where he initially joined the under-21 team.[3] He made his professional debut for Go Ahead on 11 September 2020, in the 2–0 win against SC Cambuur, coming on for Bradly van Hoeven in the 88th minute. He made a total of 20 appearances in the Eerste Divisie for Go Ahead, who finished second and thus won promotion to the Eredivisie. 

On 30 July 2021, Eersteling signed a two-year contract with FC Utrecht, initially joining the reserve team Jong FC Utrecht.

References

2001 births
Living people
Dutch footballers
Footballers from Rotterdam
Association football defenders
Eerste Divisie players
Sparta Rotterdam players
Go Ahead Eagles players
Jong FC Utrecht players